Judt is a surname. Notable people with the surname include:

 Juri Judt (born 1986), German footballer
 Thorsten Judt (born 1971), German footballer
 Tony Judt (1948–2010), English-American historian, essayist, and professor

Jewish surnames
Ethnonymic surnames